KK AMAK SP was a basketball club based in Ohrid, North Macedonia.  AMAK SP participated in the Macedonian Premier League.  Their home arena was the Biljanini Izvori hall.

History
AMAK SP was formed in the year 2005 in the city of Ohrid by the AMAK SP a safety belts producing company. They have been playing the Second Macedonian League but as of the 2006 season they advanced to the Macedonian First League. In 2009, the club won its first major trophy by winning the Macedonian Basketball Cup.

Honours

Domestic Achievements
Macedonian Cup Winner - 2009

Notable players

 Eftim Bogoev
 Vojdan Stojanovski
 Damjan Stojanovski
 Igor Penov
 Vlatko Nedelkov
 Angel Tasevski
 Igor Trajkovski
 Jarrid Frye
 Will Caudle
 Mirolsav Čubrilo
 Slaviša Bogavac
 Slobodan Agoč
 Ninoslav Tmušić
 Mladen Gambiroža

References
KK AMAK SP Official Web site
KK AMAK SP profile on Basketball.org.mk

Basketball teams in North Macedonia
Sport in Ohrid